Nemoria festaria is a species of emerald moth in the family Geometridae. It is found in North America.

The MONA or Hodges number for Nemoria festaria is 7044.

References

Further reading

External links

 

Geometrinae